Hanko Northern railway station (abbrev. Hkp,  and ) is a railway stop in the port city of Hanko, Finland along the Hanko-Hyvinkää Railroad. The stop is located next to a level crossing on Finnish national road 25 at one end of the Hanko railway yard.

References 

Railway stations in Uusimaa
Railway station northern